The Preparatory Committee for Philippine Independence or the PCPI was the drafting body of the 1943 Philippine Constitution during the Japanese Occupation of the Philippines during World War II.  The constitution was signed and unanimously approved on September 4, 1943 by its members and was then ratified by a popular convention of the KALIBAPI in Manila on September 7, 1943.

Background
In mid-1942, Japanese Premier Hideki Tōjō had promised the Filipinos "the honor of independence" which meant that the committee would be supplanted by a formal republic.  The PCPI was welcomed by some, especially by Filipino nationalists who had long-awaited of a "Genuine Asiatic independence". 

The PCPI was composed, in large part, of members of the prewar Philippine National Assembly and of individuals with experience as delegates to the convention that had drafted the 1935 Philippine Constitution. The 1943 draft constitution was limited in duration; provided for indirect election of the legislature; and a stronger executive branch.

Leadership

Presidents
José P. Laurel
Elpidio R. Quirino

Vice Presidents
 Benigno Aquino, Sr.
 Ramon Avanceña

Other members
 Jorge B. Vargas
 Antonio de las Alas
Emilio Aguinaldo
 Claro M. Recto
 Quintin Paredes
 José Yulo
 Vicente Madrigal
 Manuel Roxas
 Sa Ramain (Alauya Alonto)
 Emiliano Tria Tirona
 Melecio Arranz
 Camilo Osías
 Rafael Alunan
 Pedro Sabido
 Teofilo Sison
 Manuel C. Briones

Drafting

Further reading
Philippine House of Representatives Congressional Library

External links

Political history of the Philippines
History of the Congress of the Philippines
Philippines in World War II
1943 establishments in the Philippines
Organizations established in 1943